1,6-Hexanediol is an organic compound with the formula (CH2CH2CH2OH)2. It is a colorless water-soluble solid.

Production 
1,6-Hexanediol is prepared by the hydrogenation of adipic acid or its esters. Laboratory preparation could be achieved by reduction of adipates with lithium aluminium hydride, although this method is impractical on a commercial scale.

Properties
As 1,6-hexanediol contains the hydroxyl group, it undergoes the typical chemical reactions of alcohols such as dehydration, substitution, esterification.

Dehydration of 1,6-hexanediol gives oxepane, 2-methyltetrahydropyran and 2-ethyltetrahydrofuran. Corresponding thiophene and pyrrolidone can be made by reacting 1,6-hexanediol with hydrogen sulfide and ammonia respectively.

Uses 
1,6-Hexanediol is widely used for industrial polyester and polyurethane production..

1,6-Hexanediol can improve the hardness and flexibility of polyesters as it contains a fairly long hydrocarbon chain. In polyurethanes, it is used as a chain extender, and the resulting modified polyurethane has high resistance to hydrolysis as well as mechanical strength, but with a low glass transition temperature.

It is also an intermediate to acrylics as a crosslinking agent, e.g. hexanediol diacrylate. Unsaturated polyester resins have also been made from 1,6-hexanediol, along with styrene, maleic anhydride and fumaric acid.

Safety

1,6-Hexanediol has low toxicity and low flammability, and is generally considered as safe. It is not irritating to skin, but may irritate the respiratory tract or mucous membranes. Dust or vapor of the compound can irritate or damage the eyes.

References

Alkanediols